Mar Gaye Oye Loko is a 2018 Indian-Punjabi language Comedy film directed by Simerjit Singh starring Gippy Grewal, Binnu Dhillon & Sapna Pabbi in lead roles. It is a Punjabi comedy about a simple boy, Tittu (Gippy Grewal), and his journey to finally marry the girl of his dreams, Simran (Sapna Pabbi). She in turn happens to be interested in the local gangster, Gill Baiji (Binnu Dhillon). Gill Baiji gets shot by his arch rival Sidhu (Jaggi Singh) and this event changes Tittu's fate forever. The film has Jaswinder Bhalla, Gurpreet Ghuggi, Karamjit Anmol, B.N. Sharma and Jaggi Singh in supporting roles; it marked the Punjabi debut for Sapna Pabbi.

Mar Gaye Oye Loko’s story was written by Gippy Grewal who had also written Ardaas and Manje Bistre which are all released under his production company Humble Motion Pictures. Gippy Grewal served as writer, producer and actor in the film. In an interview Gippy Grewal disclosed that the role of Gill Baiji played by Binnu Dhillon was written for himself but due to requirements for looks he didn't play the role. Film was shot in Punjab. Soundtrack of film was composed by Kuwar Virk, Jay K, Snappy and Gurmeet Singh.

Mar Gaye Oye Loko was released theatrically on 31 August 2018; it received mixed response from film critics and audience alike. Commercially it performed well at box office and emerged as hit, in its opening weekend. It was able to gross  99.5 million worldwide and 201 million in its whole theatrical run. The film is also the 26th highest grossing Punjabi film of all time and 5th highest grossing Punjabi film of 2018.

Cast

 Gippy Grewal as Tittu
 Binnu Dhillon as Gill Bai
 Sapna Pabbi as Simran
 Raghveer Boli as Moongi
 Jaswinder Bhalla as Yamraj
 Karamjit Anmol as Hakalchu Yamdoot
 Gurpreet Ghuggi as Pardhan
 B.N. Sharma as Doctor
 Jaggi Singh as Sidhu
 Parminder Gill as staff nurse

Soundtrack

Track list

Releases

Gippy Grewal immediately after success of Subedar Joginder Singh announced film on day of Baisakhi. Mar Gaye Oye Loko's official teaser was released on 15 July 2018 & official trailer was released on 13 August 2018. Film was released worldwide on 31 August 2018. Mar Gaye Oye Loko was edited by Rohit Dhiman and its final cut ran for approximately 117 minutes. The film was produced by Gippy Grewal's production house Humble Motion Pictures. The international distribution rights for the project were acquired by the Mumbai-based production and distribution house, Rising Star Entertainment Ltd. Mar Gaye Oye Loko was also released in Pakistan on 7 September 2018.

Reception

Box office
Mar Gaye Oye Loko grossed  18 million on its opening day from India which makes it eighth highest opening ever for a Punjabi and third best opening of 2018 but it was far away from their last release Carry On Jatta 2. In its opening weekend Mar Gaye Oye Loko giving tough competition to Bollywood film Stree in overseas grossed ₹70.1 million from India, ₹6351,000 from United States, ₹10.2 million from Canada, ₹6.9 million at Australia, ₹3.9 million from UK and ₹1930,000 from New Zealand. After second weekend, the numbers were grown at overseas and domestic. The film raked   from India, ₹1.31 crore from United States, ₹1.91 crore from Canada, ₹69.52 lacs from United Kingdom & Ireland, ₹1.1 crores from Australia and ₹29.6 lacs from New Zealand. In its third week the film faced a small drop in collections. The film had collected ₹14.3 million in United States, ₹37.1 million in Canada, ₹7996,000 in United Kingdom, ₹11.9 million in Australia and ₹3159,000 in New Zealand till its third weekend.

Critical reception
Mar Gaye Oye Loko received mixed reviews from different websites. According to reviewers the new experiment doesn't met expectations. However, the attempt is feeble, perhaps justifying balance between films as a medium of entertainment, and that of social messages.

Jaspreet Nijher of Times Of India reviewed Mar Gaye Oye Loko by giving 2.5 critic's rating out of 5. About the comedy, reviewer said, "The famous five of Punjabi comedy- Binnu Dhillon, Jaswinder Bhalla, Karmjit Anmol, BN Sharma and Gurpreet Ghuggi, manage to helm the film's comic timing and lift it out to its true genre of a romcom." Criticising dilemma made in film reviewer said, "Straddling this dilemma costs the film its comic dose as the director juggled his two themes. The film is also lampooning singers like Sidhu Moose Wala’s violent songs, Parmish Verma's infamous shooting incident to bridge this dilemma whereas music, given by Rahar Fateh Ali Khan and Guru Randhawa, saves the day, being refreshing and soulful." Reviewer appreciates the work of Sapna Pabbi, saying, "TV actress, Sapna Pabbi (who plays Simran), is just another pretty addition to Punjabi cinema, perfectly towing the precedence of being only a dolled-up prop to the script."

Reviewer of website BookMyShow praised the direction work of Simerjit Singh, saying, "Simerjit Singh's direction has its trademark humor and it works for most parts of the film. He is better off in emotional and romantic scenes." Reviewer also praised the script written by Gippy Grewal whereas criticized the dialogues, saying, "At times, the characters try too hard to make you laugh. The dialogues also seem forced at places." On last added, "On the whole, Mar Gaye Oye Loko is a fun, clean film that works despite the over-the-top comedy. It takes funny jibes at death and the afterlife and that's where the film succeeds. Do not compare it with Carry on Jatta 2 or expect the same team to deliver a similar laughathon and you would enjoy the film thoroughly."

References

External links
 

Indian romantic comedy films
Indian films with live action and animation
Films directed by Simerjit Singh
Punjabi-language Indian films
2010s Punjabi-language films
2018 romantic comedy films
Films scored by Guru Randhawa